The Oklahoma State Board of Pharmacy is an agency of the state of Oklahoma responsible for control and regulation the practice of pharmacy as well as the licensing of pharmacists in the state.
 State Board of Pharmacy website

State law enforcement agencies of Oklahoma